The Bangladeshi cricket team toured Pakistan in April 2008 to play five one day internationals and a Twenty20 International. The series was arranged at short notice following Australia's decision to pull out of their scheduled tour of Pakistan due to security reasons.

Squads

ODI series

1st ODI

2nd ODI

3rd ODI

4th ODI

5th ODI

Only T20I

References

2008
2008 in cricket
2008 in Pakistani cricket
Pakistani cricket seasons from 2000–01
International cricket competitions in 2008
2008 in Bangladeshi sport